C16orf96, or chromosome 16 open reading frame 96, is a protein in humans that is encoded by C16orf96 that is found on the 16th chromosome. In Homo sapiens, the protein is 1141 amino acids in length

Protein

Characteristics
The molecular weight of the processed C16orf96 protein in humans is 125kdal with an isoelectric point of 6.58 About 9% of the amino acid makeup of C16orf96 is proline, which is significantly higher than an average human gene.

Post Translational Modification
Human C16orf96 has a large amount of predicted phosphorylation sites on serines throughout the protein. C16orf96 also has been found in primates and mammals to have both a nuclear import and export signal

Domains
This gene contains some known domains, such as: an RNA recognition motif, a Merozoite surface protein (MSP-1), a pentapeptide repeat MXKDX, and a domain of unknown function (DUF1387). These domains could give a hint of what the function of this gene is.

Structure

Secondary Structure
The majority of the secondary structure of C16orf96 is alpa-helices with coils being the second most abundant structure.

Tertiary Structure
At this time there is no known tertiary structure for C16orf96.

Cellular Localization
The C16orf96 protein is predicted to be localized in the nucleus 82% of the time and 4.5% of the time in the cytosol and 4.5% of the time in the mitochondria.

Expression

C16orf96 expression is generally low in cells. in situ hybridization experiments suggest that C16orf96 RNA is only expressed in the testis while the EST profile for C16orf96 shows gene expression is low in testis and skin only.
Expression of the C16orf96 gene is modulated by the depletion of both hypoxia induced factor 1/2α (HIF1/2α). When only one of the factors is depleted expression does not change suggesting that there is redundancy with these two HIF.

Homology
Strict orthologs of this gene exist only in mammals. However, a portion of DUF1387 is found in more distant species back to reptiles. No orthologs of this gene can be found in plants, fungi, or bacteria. Suggesting that this gene is relatively new and evolves quickly.

Function 
The function of C16orf96 is currently unknown. Studies have cited this gene among many other genes as a possible candidate that has an effect on childhood obesity.

References

External links 
 

Genes on human chromosome 16